Good Casting is a 2020 South Korean television series starring Choi Kang-hee, Yoo In-young, Kim Ji-young, Lee Sang-yeob, Lee Jun-young and Lee Jong-hyuk. It aired on SBS TV from April 27 to June 16, 2020.

Synopsis

Legendary espionage agents give girl power a whole new meaning in this thrilling action comedy. Once part of South Korea's top secret National Intelligence Service, a group of talented female agents are reassigned to go undercover in a case involving corruption and leaked trade secrets at the country's largest conglomerate. After several mistakes during important missions, Baek Chan Mi (Choi Kang Hee) was reassigned to the cybersecurity team, but dreams of returning to her former role. Hwang Mi Soon has left agent life behind and become a full-time homemaker. Meanwhile, Lim Ye Eun, a smart single mom and desk agent dreams of being promoted to an undercover spymaster working in the field. Their lives collide when Don Kwan Soo, a longtime director in the NIS, recruits all three for a do or die mission.

Cast

Main
 Choi Kang-hee as Baek Chan-mi / Baek Jang-mi
 Yoo In-young as Im Ye-eun / Im Jung-eun
 Kim Ji-young as Hwang Mi-soon / Gi Mi-sun
 Lee Sang-yeob as Yoon Seok-ho
 Lee Jun-young as Kang Woo-won
 Lee Jong-hyuk as Dong Kwan-soo

Supporting

National Intelligence Service
 Jung In-gi as Seo Gook-hwan 
 Park Kyung-soon as Bae Moo-hyuk
 Hwang Bo-mi as Gan Tae-hee
 Kim Jin-ho as Geum Dong-seok

Il Kwang Hitech
 Woo Hyun as Myung Gye-chul
 Lee Sang-hoon as Tak Sang-gi
 Kim Yong-hee as Ok Chul
 as Byun Woo-seok
 Han Soo-jin as Assistant Goo
 Jo Young-hoon as Seol Young-hoon
 Kim Kyung-sook as Park Kyung-sook

Main's entourage
 Cha Soo-yeon as Shim Hwa-ran
 Lee Seung-hyung as Nam Bong-man
 Yoon Sa-bong as Prison boss
 Kim Bo-yoon as Nam Joo-yeon
 Bae Jin-woong as Pi Chul-woong
 Sung Hyuk as Kwon Min-seok
 Noh Ha-yeon as Kwon So-hee

Production

Development
The series is based on a screenplay which was one of the winners of the 2016 2H MBC Drama Screenplay Competition (miniseries category), alongside the 2019–20 SBS television series Hot Stove League.
 
Early working title of the series is Miscasting. Director Choi Young-hoon first wanted to name the series that way because the characters are miscasted for the operation, but he changed it to Good Casting as all three actresses showed good team work.

Filming
The series is entirely pre-produced. Filming ended on February 7, 2020.

Original soundtrack

Part 1

Part 2

Part 3

Part 4

Part 5

Viewership

Awards and nominations

References

External links
  
 
 

Seoul Broadcasting System television dramas
Korean-language television shows
2020 South Korean television series debuts
2020 South Korean television series endings
South Korean action television series
South Korean comedy television series
National Intelligence Service (South Korea) in fiction
South Korean pre-produced television series